This list of gastropods described in 2010, is a list of new taxa of snails and slugs of every kind that have been described (following the rules of the ICZN) during the year 2010. The list only includes taxa at the level of genus or species. For changes in taxonomy above the level of genus, see Changes in the taxonomy of gastropods since 2005.

There were described 1069 new species and subspecies of gastropods in 2010, 107 new genera and subgenera of gastropods and 11 new family group names (according to the literature that has been included into The Zoological Record).

Fossil gastropods 
from Paleontological Journal:
 Periaulax tsheganica Amitrov, 2010
 Pusillina kazakhstanica Amitrov, 2010

from Palaeontology
 Peracle charlotteae Janssen & Little, 2010
 new subgenus Proarcirsa (Schafbergia) Gatto & Monari, 2010
 Ataphrus cordevolensis Gatto & Monari, 2010
 Guidonia pseudorotula Gatto & Monari, 2010
 Proarcirsa (Schafbergia) zirettoensis Gatto & Monari, 2010
 Tectarius japigiae Esu & Girotti, 2010
 Hydrobia dubuissoni hydruntina Esu & Girotti, 2010
 Pseudamnicola messapica Esu & Girotti, 2010
 Pseudamnicola palmariggii Esu & Girotti, 2010
 Stenothyrella salentina Esu & Girotti, 2010

from Molluscan Research:
 Alvania baldoi Garilli & Parrinello, 2010
 Alvania dimitrii Garilli & Parrinello, 2010

Marine gastropods 
from Aldrovandia:
 Cerithiopsis oculisfictis Prkic & Mariottini, 2010
 Cerithiopsis petanii Prkic & Mariottini, 2010

from Archiv für Molluskenkunde:
 Niveria harriettae Fehse & Grego, 2010

from Basteria
 four new species of Cerithiopsis
 Lobatus ... ..., 2010

from Bulletin of Malacology, Taiwan:
 Babylonia hongkongensis Lai & Guo, 2010<ref name="Lee 2010">Lee C.-Y. & Chen C.-L. (2010). "A new Siphonalia in the family Buccinidae from northeast Taiwan". Bulletin of Malacology, Taiwan 34: 45-48.</ref>
 Siphonalia nigrobrunnea Lee & Chen, 2010

from Invertebrate Biology:
 Toledonia warenella Golding, 2010

from Molluscan Research:
 Epitonium smriglioi Bonfitto, 2010

from The Nautilus:
 Bolma castelinae Alf, Maestrati & Bouchet, 2010
 Bolma kreipli Alf, Maestrati & Bouchet, 2010
 Bolma mainbaza Alf, Maestrati & Bouchet, 2010
 Bolma pseudobathyraphis Alf, Maestrati & Bouchet, 2010
 Bolma tantalea Alf, Maestrati & Bouchet, 2010
 Calliostoma ceciliae ..., 2010
 Scabrotrophon hawaiiensis Houart & Moffitt, 2010
 Zeadmete atlantica Petit, L. D. Campbell & S. C. Campbell, 2010

from Novapex:
 Cirsotrema hertzae Garcia, 2010
 Cirsotrema skoglundae Garcia, 2010
 Cochlespira bevdeynzerae Garcia, 2010
 Cochlespira cavalier Garcia, 2010
 Cochlespira laurettamarrae Garcia, 2010
 Cochlespira leeana Garcia, 2010
 Mitromica gallegoi Rolán, Fernández-Garcés & Lee, 2010
 Schwartziella luisalvarezi Rolán & Fernández-Garcés, 2010
 Schwartziella nicaobesa Rolán & Fernández-Garcés, 2010
 Schwartziella yoguii Rolán & Fernández-Garcés, 2010
 Turritella nzimaorum Ryall & Vos, 2010
 Turritella wareni Ryall & Vos, 2010

from Proceedings of the Academy of Natural Sciences of Philadelphia:
 Prionovolva melonis Rosenberg, 2010

from Proceedings of the California Academy of Sciences:
 Okenia felis Gosliner, 2010
 Flabellina goddardi Gosliner, 2010

from The Veliger:
 Anatoma ... ..., 2010
 Bostrycapulus heteropoma Collin & Rolán, 2010
 Hypselodoris juliae Dacosta, Padula & Schrödl, 2010
 new genus Trophonella Harasewych & Pastorino, 2010
 Trophonella rugosolamellata Harasewych & Pastorino, 2010

from Visaya:
 Dolichupis leei Fehse & Grego, 2010
 Dolichupis tindigei Fehse & Grego, 2010
 Dolichupis mediagibber Fehse & Grego, 2010
 Conus dorotheae Monnier & Limpalaër, 2010
 Plagiostropha rubrifaba Chino & Stahlschmidt, 2010
 Plagiostropha roseopinna Chino & Stahlschmidt, 2010
 Plagiostropha bicolor Chino & Stahlschmidt, 2010
 Plagiostropha vertigomaeniana Chino & Stahlschmidt, 2010

from Zootaxa:
 Sinezona kayae Geiger & McLean, 2010
 Sinezona hawaiiensis Geiger & McLean, 2010
 Sinezona carolarum Geiger & McLean, 2010
 Coronadoa demisispira Geiger & McLean, 2010
 Anatoma alternatisculpta Geiger & McLean, 2010
 Anatoma plicatazona Geiger & McLean, 2010
 Thieleella peruviana Geiger & McLean, 2010
 Thieleella bathypacifica Geiger & McLean, 2010

 Freshwater gastropods 

from Archiv für Molluskenkunde:
 Pseudamnicola boucheti Glöer, Bouzid & Boeters, 2010
 Pseudamnicola chabii Glöer, Bouzid & Boeters, 2010
 Pseudamnicola ghamizii Glöer, Bouzid & Boeters, 2010
 Pseudamnicola algeriensis Glöer, Bouzid & Boeters, 2010
 Pseudamnicola gerhardfalkneri Glöer, Bouzid & Boeters, 2010
 Pseudamnicola calamensis Glöer, Bouzid & Boeters, 2010
 Pseudamnicola fineti Glöer, Bouzid & Boeters, 2010
 Pseudamnicola linae Glöer, Bouzid & Boeters, 2010
 Pseudamnicola rouagi Glöer, Bouzid & Boeters, 2010
 Mercuria bourguignati Glöer, Bouzid & Boeters, 2010
 Mercuria gauthieri Glöer, Bouzid & Boeters, 2010

from Biological Journal of the Linnean Society genus Madagasikara Köhler & Glaubrecht, 2010
 Madagasikara vazimba Köhler & Glaubrecht, 2010
 Madagasikara vivipara Köhler & Glaubrecht, 2010
 Madagasikara zazavavindrano Köhler & Glaubrecht, 2010

from Journal of Conchology Pseudobithynia ambrakis Glöer, Falnoiwski & Pešić, 2010
 Pseudobithynia euboeensis Glöer, Falnoiwski & Pešić, 2010
 Pseudobithynia zogari Glöer, Falnoiwski & Pešić, 2010

from Journal of Molluscan Studies Pyrgulopsis ignota Hershler, Liu & Lang, 2010

from Zoosystematics and Evolution Brotia yunnanensis Köhler, Du & Yang, 2010

from Zootaxa:
 Pyrgulopsis castaicensis Hershler & Liu, 2010
 Pyrgulopsis milleri Hershler & Liu, 2010

 Land gastropods 

from Archiv für Molluskenkunde:
 Albinaria pondika Welter-Schultes, 2010
 genus Ptychauchenia Nordsieck, 2010
 Ptychauchenia panhai Nordsieck, 2010
 Grandinenia pallidissima Nordsieck, 2010
 Neniauchenia tonkinensis Nordsieck, 2010
 Columbinia elegans Nordsieck, 2010
 Columbinia elegantula Nordsieck, 2010
 Columbinia marcapatensis Nordsieck, 2010
 Columbinia hemmeni Nordsieck, 2010
 Neniella macrosoma Nordsieck, 2010
 Pseudogracilinenia pulchricosta Nordsieck, 2010
 Symptychiella acuminata Nordsieck, 2010
 Symptychiella fratermajor Nordsieck, 2010
 Incaglaia angrandi soukupi Nordsieck, 2010
 Incaglaia angrandi variegata Nordsieck, 2010
 Parabalea bicolor undaticosta Nordsieck, 2010
 Parabalea gibbosula grisea Nordsieck, 2010
 Parabalea latestriata queroensis Nordsieck, 2010
 Parabalea parcecostata meridionalis Nordsieck, 2010
 Peruinia peruana erythrostoma Nordsieck, 2010
 Pseudogracilinenia pulchricosta lamellicosta Nordsieck, 2010
 Symptychiella bilamellata costulata Nordsieck, 2010
 Symptychiella bilamellata gracilicosta Nordsieck, 2010
 Symptychiella bilamellata laevigata Nordsieck, 2010
 Acroptychia mahafinaritra Boucardicus anjarae Boucardicus avo Boucardicus hetra Boucardicus lalinify Boucardicus mahavariana Boucardicus matoatoa Boucardicus menoi Boucardicus peggyae Boucardicus pulchellus Boucardicus tantelyae Cyathopoma anjombona Cyathopoma hoditra Cyathopoma iridescens Cyathopoma madio Cyathopoma matsoko Fauxulus tsarakely Gulella andriantanteliae Gulella thompsoni Parvedentulina andriantanteliae Parvedentulina benjamini Parvedentulina jeani Parvedentulina paulayi Parvedentulina thompsoni Ampelita owengriffithsi Reticulapex michellae Kalidos gora Kalidos manotrika Kalidos manta Kaliella crandalli Microcystis albosuturalis Microcystis fotsifotsy Microcystis vony Sitala burchi Sitala mavo Sitala stanisicifrom Genus Montenegrina dofleini sinosi Páll-Gergely 2010

from Journal of Conchology Armenica (Armenica) laevicollis nemethi Páll-Gergely 2010
 Euxinastra (Odonteuxina) harchbelica Páll-Gergely 2010
 Strumosa strumosa erasmusi Páll-Gergely 2010

from Molluscan Research:
 Carinotrachia admirale Köhler, 2010 - with two of its subspecies: Carinotrachia admirale admirale Köhler, 2010 and Carinotrachia admirale elevata Köhler, 2010
 Kimberleydiscus Köhler, 2010 - with the only one species Kimberleydiscus fasciatus Köhler, 2010
 Kimberleymelon Köhler, 2010 - with the only one species Kimberleymelon tealei Köhler, 2010

from The Nautilus:
 Staala gwaii Ovaska, Chichester & Sopuck, 2010
 Holospira fergusoni Gilbertson & Naranjo-García, 2010

from The Raffles Bulletin of Zoology:
 Amphidromus abbasi Chan & Tan, 2010 - this a validation of nomen nudum published in 2008.
 Amphidromus rottiensis Chan & Tan, 2010 - this a validation of nomen nudum published in 2008.

from Revista de Biología Tropical:
 Rectaxis pagodus Thompson, 2010
 Volutaxis (Volutaxis) eburneus Thompson, 2010

from Records of the Australian Museum:
 Amplirhagada anderdonensis Köhler, 2010
 Amplirhagada basilica Köhler, 2010
 Amplirhagada berthierana Köhler, 2010
 Amplirhagada boongareensis Köhler, 2010
 Amplirhagada buffonensis Köhler, 2010
 Amplirhagada camdenensis Köhler, 2010
 Amplirhagada decora Köhler, 2010
 Amplirhagada descartesana Köhler, 2010
 Amplirhagada dubitabile Köhler, 2010
 Amplirhagada euroa Köhler, 2010
 Amplirhagada gemina Köhler, 2010
 Amplirhagada gibsoni Köhler, 2010
 Amplirhagada indistincta Köhler, 2010
 Amplirhagada kessneri Köhler, 2010
 Amplirhagada kimberleyana Köhler, 2010
 Amplirhagada lamarckiana Köhler, 2010
 Amplirhagada mckenziei Köhler, 2010
 Amplirhagada montesqieuana Köhler, 2010
 Amplirhagada ponderi Köhler, 2010
 Amplirhagada puescheli Köhler, 2010
 Amplirhagada regia Köhler, 2010
 Amplirhagada solemiana Köhler, 2010
 Amplirhagada sphaeroidea Köhler, 2010
 Amplirhagada tricenaria Köhler, 2010
 Amplirhagada uwinsensis Köhler, 2010
 Amplirhagada yorkensis Köhler, 2010

from Ruthenica:
 Columella talgarica Schileyko & Rymzhanov, 2010
 Leucozonella corona Schileyko & Rymzhanov, 2010
 Angiomphalia nucula Schileyko & Rymzhanov, 2010

from Tuhinga:
 Atropis rarotongana Brook, 2010
 Minidonta aroa Brook, 2010
 Minidonta arorangi Brook, 2010
 Minidonta iota Brook, 2010
 Minidonta kavera Brook, 2010
 Minidonta matavera Brook, 2010
 Minidonta ngatangiia Brook, 2010
 Minidonta pue Brook, 2010
 Minidonta rutaki Brook, 2010
 Sinployea muri Brook, 2010
 Sinployea taipara Brook, 2010
 Sinployea titikaveka Brook, 2010
 Sinployea tupapa Brook, 2010
 Nesopupa rarotonga Brook, 2010

from Zootaxa:
 four new subspecies of Abida secale Chondrina ingae Kokshoorn & Gittenberger, 2010
 Chondrina marjae Kokshoorn & Gittenberger, 2010
 Chondrina pseudavenacea Kokshoorn & Gittenberger, 2010
 Chondrina arigonoides Kokshoorn & Gittenberger, 2010
 Plekocheilus vlceki Breure & Schlögl, 2010
 Plekocheilus breweri Breure & Schlögl, 2010

from Zoological Journal of the Linnean Society:
 a new family Diapheridae Panha & Naggs, 2010 have been established within Streptaxoidea.
 Diaphera prima Panha, 2010

from Zoologische Mededelingen:
 Bostryx chusgonensis sipas Breure & Mogollón Avilla, 2010
 Bostryx fragilis Breure & Mogollón Avilla, 2010
 Scutalus mariopenai Breure & Mogollón Avilla, 2010
 Scutalus phaeocheilus altoensis Breure & Mogollón Avilla, 2010

from Zoology in the Middle East:
 Schileykula attilae Páll-Gergely, 2010
 Monacha georgievi'' Páll-Gergely, 2010

See also 
 List of gastropods described in the 2000s
 List of gastropods described in 2011

References

External links 
 Searching for 2010 in Malacolog Version 4.1.1. A Database of Western Atlantic Marine Mollusca. (include all molluscs, not only gastropods) (no records yet)
 Searching for 2010 in Indo-Pacific Molluscan Species Database. (include all molluscs, not only gastropods) (no records yet)
 Articles about molluscs in Zootaxa

Gastropods